The Jersey Hitmen are a junior and youth ice hockey organization with teams in the United States Premier Hockey League (USPHL), with its top level junior team playing in the USPHL's National Collegiate Development Conference (NCDC).  The organization also has junior teams in the USPHL's Premier and Elite Divisions, as well as multiple youth teams from 10U to 18U. The teams play their home games at the Ice Vault Arena in Wayne, New Jersey.

The Hitmen used to field a 16U team in the Eastern Junior Elite Prospects League (EJEPL) and 14U teams in the Metro Elite Hockey League (MEHL) before joining the USPHL High Performance Youth Divisions.

Regular season records

Playoff records

References

External links 
 Official site

Wayne, New Jersey
Ice hockey teams in New Jersey
Ice hockey clubs established in 2003
2003 establishments in New Jersey